Ted Markland (January 15, 1933 – December 18, 2011) was an American character actor.

He is best known for the role of Reno in the NBC television series The High Chaparral.

He had a small part in the TV Western Bat Masterson (S2E21 as Rancher "Lem Taylor").

Filmography

References

External links
 

1933 births
2011 deaths
American male film actors